Bobby Matos (born July 24, 1941 in the Bronx, New York - November 11, 2017 Los Angeles ) was a Latin jazz percussionist.

He began playing music by hitting pots and pans in his grandmother's apartment. As a youth, he studied with conga drum masters Patato Valdez and Mongo Santamaría. While playing all over New York, he was encouraged to play timbales by Willie Bobo and Tito Puente and in the late 60s attended The New School and the Manhattan School of Music. Around this time, he recorded "My Latin Soul" for Phillips International Records, which made his reputation as a bandleader.

Matos has toured and recorded with artists Ben Vereen, Bette Midler, Fred Neil, Jim Croce, Joe Loco, Ray Rivera, Miriam Makeba, and scores of others. He has an extensive discography and 5 critically acclaimed albums with Ubiquity Records. His latest record is "Gratitude" on Dawan Muhammadd's LifeForce jazz label.

References

External links
Bobby Matos' website
LifeForce Jazz website

1941 births
Living people
People from the Bronx
The New School alumni
Manhattan School of Music alumni
American jazz percussionists
Ubiquity Records artists
Artists from New York City
Latin jazz musicians
Jazz musicians from New York (state)